Danosoma is a genus of beetles belonging to the family Elateridae.

The species of this genus are found in Europe and Northern America.

Species:
 Danosoma brevicorne (LeConte, 1853)

References

Elateridae
Elateridae genera